Raúl Molina Alcocer (born 25 November 1976 in Jerez de la Frontera, Province of Cádiz, Andalusia) is a Spanish retired footballer who played as a forward.

External links

Biography at Historias de Cromos 

1976 births
Living people
Footballers from Jerez de la Frontera
Spanish footballers
Association football forwards
La Liga players
Segunda División players
Segunda División B players
Tercera División players
Xerez CD footballers
Real Zaragoza B players
Atlético Madrid B players
Recreativo de Huelva players
RCD Espanyol footballers
Rayo Vallecano players
Albacete Balompié players